Derek Johnson is a Canadian provincial politician, who was elected as the Member of the Legislative Assembly of Manitoba for the riding of Interlake in the 2016 election. He is a member of the Progressive Conservative party, and defeated NDP incumbent Tom Nevakshonoff in the election.

Johnson was elected again in the 2019 Manitoba general election in the newly-created riding of Interlake-Gimli.

References

Living people
Progressive Conservative Party of Manitoba MLAs
21st-century Canadian politicians
Year of birth missing (living people)
Place of birth missing (living people)